Stephen St. John (1735 – May 9, 1785) was a member of the Connecticut House of Representatives from Norwalk in the sessions of May and October 1778, May and October 1780, May 1781, May and October 1782, May 1783, May and October 1784, and May 1785.

He was the son of Joseph St. John, and Susannah Selleck.

References 

1735 births
1785 deaths
Members of the Connecticut House of Representatives
Politicians from Norwalk, Connecticut
Connecticut militiamen in the American Revolution
Military personnel from Connecticut
18th-century American politicians